Andrea Huser (11 December 1973 – 28 November 2020) was a Swiss mountain bike racer and trail runner.

She won the Grand Raid twice, in 2016 and 2017.

Huser fell to her death on 28 November 2020 while training in the Saas-Fee area. She was reported missing later that day and her body was recovered the next day.

Titles 

2004
  Swiss champion in cycling marathon

References

External links 
 

Swiss mountain bikers
1973 births
2020 deaths
Swiss female cyclists